The 1925 Adrian Bulldogs football team was an American football team that represented Adrian College as an independent during the 1925 college football season. In its third season under head coach Dale R. Sprankle, the team compiled a 6–3 record and outscored opponents by a total of 84 to 62. The team played its home games at Adrian Athletic Field in Adrian, Michigan.

Schedule

References

Adrian
Adrian Bulldogs football seasons
Adrian Bulldogs football